The Bestune NAT is a purpose-built electric mid-size multi purpose vehicle (MPV) produced by Bestune. The NAT was called the E05 during development phase and was renamed after the initial reveal. According to Bestune, NAT stands for “Next Automatic Taxi”. It was mainly developed for ride-hailing services.

Overview

The Bestune E05 was first shown at the 2021 Haikou International New Energy Vehicle and Connected Mobility Show. The E05 has dimensions of 4451 mm/1844 mm/ 1681 mm. It is planned to be exported to Vietnam and Russia in mid 2020.

Just like the BYD D1, the Bestune NAT features a sliding door on the right side to free passengers from opening the door and potentially hitting cyclists or pedestrians. 

Four different versions are planned with two versions designated for taxis, a variant for the DiDi ride hailing service and a variant for the FAW-backed T3 ride hailing service.

See also
BYD D1
Bestune
Bestune E01

References

Vans
Cars introduced in 2021
Cars of China
Minivans
Front-wheel-drive vehicles
Taxi vehicles
Electric taxis
Production electric cars